Henrik Lundqvist (born 2 March 1982) is a Swedish former professional ice hockey goaltender. He played his entire 15-season career with the New York Rangers of the National Hockey League (NHL). Before winning the Vezina Trophy in 2012, he was nominated in each of his first three seasons, and is the only goaltender in NHL history to record eleven 30-win seasons in his first twelve seasons. He holds the record for most wins by a European-born goaltender in the NHL. His dominating play during his rookie season resulted in the New York media and Rangers fans giving him the nickname "King Henrik". During the 2006 Winter Olympics in Turin, Italy, he led the Swedish men's team to their second Olympic gold medal.

Before joining the Rangers, Lundqvist played for Frölunda HC in Swedish Elitserien. During his years in Sweden, he developed into the league's finest goaltender, winning the Honken Trophy in three consecutive seasons (2003, 2004, and 2005). In 2005, he also won two of the most prestigious awards in Swedish ice hockey, the Guldpucken (Golden Puck) and the Guldhjälmen (Golden Helmet).

Lundqvist was considered a butterfly style goaltender, though unorthodox because of the aggressive way he performed the butterfly. He was known for his strong positional play, both mental and physical toughness, and his upright torso stance.

Early life
Lundqvist grew up with his identical twin brother Joel in Åre, Jämtland, an area where alpine skiing is the most popular winter activity, though Henrik and Joel chose to play ice hockey over the more popular winter sports. During the winters, their kindergarten teachers used the kindergarten's  sandpit to freeze an outdoor ice rink where the twins would frequently skate. Their interest in hockey grew even stronger when their father Peter took the twins to see Västra Frölunda HC play in Scandinavium, Gothenburg. Henrik has said he and Joel were very competitive growing up, in sports as well as school. Peter worked for a company which sponsored Frölunda, and Henrik and Joel saw many games in Scandinavium, where Frölunda became their favorite team. In 1990, Henrik and Joel joined Järpens IF and started playing organized hockey for the first time. During one practice, when the coach asked if anyone wanted to be a goaltender, Joel grabbed and raised Henrik's arm and said that his brother would like to. In 1993, the family moved to Båstad, Skåne, in southern Sweden to support their older sister Gabriella's tennis career. Henrik and Joel then joined local team Rögle BK, and were both selected for Scania's regional team in Sverigepucken in 1995. Henrik was selected to play for Scania in TV-pucken in 1996, and in 1997, when Joel was also selected. During the 1997–98 season, Henrik and Joel were extensively scouted by Frölunda, and while playing for Rögle in the 1998 Scandinavium Cup in Gothenburg, Frölunda's junior team manager and under-16 coach Janne Karlsson contacted their father, who told Henrik and Joel about Frölunda's interest in them while driving home to Båstad.

Professional career

Frölunda (2000–2005)
After having a successful pre-season, Lundqvist made his Elitserien debut in the season opener on 21 September 2000 in a 4–2 loss against Brynäs IF. Lundqvist bounced back and recorded his first win in the following away game against IF Björklöven, stopping 18 shots and only allowing one goal while being short-handed. In his third straight start, Lundqvist allowed two early first period goals in a game against Timrå IK and was pulled in favour of veteran goaltender Håkan Algotsson. Lundqvist would dress for only ten more games that season and earned only one start, a shootout loss to Djurgårdens IF. Lundqvist lost his roster spot to American veteran goaltender Pat Jablonski, who joined the team in October. Tommy Boustedt, the coach of the team at the time, later said that:

Lundqvist played in nine games for IF Mölndal Hockey in the Swedish second tier Allsvenskan before joining Frölunda's junior team in the J20 SuperElit in December. After his poor play in Allsvenskan and a tough start in the J20 SuperElit, he allowed six goals in an exhibition game against Canada. National junior team coaches Bo "Kulon" Lennartsson and Mikael Tisell were worried and decided to have a talk with Lundqvist, where they questioned his motivation. Lundqvist's turning point came at the turn of the year at the 2001 World Junior Ice Hockey Championships in Moscow, where he led the Swedish national junior's team to a fourth-place finish in the tournament. He spent the rest of the season in the J20 SuperElit where he played 18 games, leading the league in minutes played by a goaltender. In the playoffs, he led Frölunda to their second straight Anton Cup win, which came in a 5–2 win over Leksands IF in the final at the Stockholm Globe Arena.

In December 2004, The Hockey News rated Lundqvist the sixth-best European prospect, the lone goaltender in their European top-ten list. Also in December, Lundqvist joined fellow future Rangers prospect Al Montoya on McKeen's list of top goaltending prospects, where he was ranked seventh in the group.

During the 2005 season, Lundqvist broke four Swedish national records: lowest goals against average (1.05), highest save percentage (.962), longest goalless streak (at 172 minutes and 29 seconds) and most shutouts in a season (6). He was also named Best Goaltender, Best Player and was selected as the league's MVP by fellow players.

In 180 appearances with Frölunda, he amassed a 1.96 goals against average (GAA) and a .927 save percentage, leading them to four consecutive playoff appearances and winning two titles in 2003 and 2005.

New York Rangers (2005–2020)

Rookie season and arrival of "The King"
At the beginning of his rookie season in 2005–06, Lundqvist was slotted into the Rangers lineup as a backup to starting goaltender Kevin Weekes. After losing Weekes to injury in the second game of the season against the Montreal Canadiens, Lundqvist made his long-anticipated NHL debut on 8 October 2005, against the New Jersey Devils, stopping 24 of 27 shots in a 3–2 overtime loss. Five days later, on 13 October, Lundqvist made his home debut in front of a sold-out crowd of 18,200 at Madison Square Garden in what was his first NHL win, a 4–1 victory against the Devils.

Lundqvist, who would be known throughout his NHL career and international play simply as "The King," was first given this nickname by the New York Post Rangers beat columnist, Larry Brooks, on 16 October 2005, following Lundqvist's performance against the Atlanta Thrashers, a 5–1 victory for the Rangers. Larry Brooks, in describing Lundqvist's performance in the game wrote the following:

His first career shutout came on 17 October 2005 against the Florida Panthers, only his fifth NHL game, and with it Lundqvist became the first rookie goaltender to record a shutout for the Rangers since John Vanbiesbrouck on 2 January 1985. During the season, Lundqvist also became the first Rangers rookie to post 20 wins in a season since Mike Richter recorded 21 in 1990–91. Finishing the season with 30 wins, Lundqvist broke the Rangers rookie goaltending record of 29 wins, previously held by Jim Henry (1941–42) and Johnny Bower (1953–54). Lundqvist was among the NHL leaders in several categories: fifth in GAA (2.24), fourth in save percentage (.922), 11th in wins (30) and tied for 16th in shutouts with two. However, his regular season success did not continue in the playoffs, where he appeared in three playoff games, posted a 0–3 record, a 4.40 GAA and an .835 save percentage in a series loss to the Devils. He was a finalist for the Vezina Trophy, awarded annually to the NHL's best goaltender, but he was not a finalist for the Calder Memorial Trophy, awarded to the rookie of the year, because of a high quality crop of first-year players. He was named to the NHL All-Rookie Team alongside Sidney Crosby, Alexander Ovechkin, Brad Boyes, Dion Phaneuf and Andrej Meszároš. He won the 2005–06 MetLife/Steven McDonald Extra Effort Award, a New York Rangers team award.

Establishing himself, Vezina Trophy season

By the start of his second season with the NHL, Lundqvist had already made a name for himself in the hockey world, among his fellow players and with Ranger fans and was now widely known by his nickname "King Henrik" or simply "The King."

On 14 December 2006, against the Dallas Stars, Lundqvist became the first NHL goaltender to face his twin brother, Joel. He and his brother are only the third set of twins to play each other in an NHL game. The game was won by Lundqvist and the Rangers. In the Rangers' 7–0 win in Game 3 of the 2007 Eastern Conference Quarterfinals over the Atlanta Thrashers, Lundqvist became the first Rangers goaltender since Mike Richter in 1997 to record a playoff shutout. The win was also the Rangers' first home playoff win since Richter's shutout. For the second consecutive year, Lundqvist was a finalist for the Vezina Trophy. Because Lundqvist was tied with Miikka Kiprusoff for third place in balloting, there were four finalists for an NHL individual trophy for the first time in league history. During the off-season, Lundqvist signed a one-year, US$4.25 million contract extension with the Rangers.

On 13 February 2008, Lundqvist signed a six-year, US$41.25 million contract extension with the Rangers averaging $6.875 million per season. This made him the highest-paid goaltender in the NHL on average over the length of his contract. On 24 February 2008, Lundqvist became the first Rangers goaltender to record eight shutouts in a single season since Eddie Giacomin in 1970–71. On 6 March 2008, he recorded his 30th win of the season, making him just the second goaltender, along with Ron Hextall, to record at least 30 wins in each of his first three NHL seasons. On 9 March 2008, Lundqvist became the first Rangers goaltender to record nine shutouts in a season since Eddie Giacomin's 1966–67 season in a 1–0 win against the Boston Bruins. Lundqvist was named the Rangers Most Valuable Player for the fifth consecutive season (2006–07 to 2010–11), as voted by the Professional Hockey Writers' Association. He became the first Rangers player to earn the Rangers MVP award five consecutive times.

On 1 October 2008, Lundqvist and the New York Rangers won the Victoria Cup in 2008 when they won 4–3 over Metallurg Magnitogorsk.

On 8 January 2009, Lundqvist was selected to play in the 2009 NHL All-Star Game in Montreal. On 24 January 2009, Lundqvist made his first All-Star appearance in the Elimination Shootout. He stopped 12 of 16 shots in the shootout as Shane Doan won the competition. The next day, he played in the second period of the All-Star Game, in which he gave up six goals.

On 12 March 2009, Lundqvist became the first NHL goaltender to win at least 30 games in his first four seasons with a win over the Nashville Predators. In September 2009, despite having played only four seasons with the club, the book 100 Ranger Greats ranked Lundqvist at No. 90 all-time of more than 900 New York Rangers' players who had played during the team's first 82 seasons.

On 25 March 2010, Lundqvist became the first NHL goaltender to win at least 30 games in his first five seasons after defeating the New Jersey Devils in a shootout.

In January 2011, Lundqvist and teammate Marc Staal were named All-Stars for the 2011 NHL All-Star Game in Raleigh, North Carolina. Both players were drafted by Staal's older brother Eric, who was one of the captains for the event. On 30 January 2011, Lundqvist played in the third period of the All-Star game, stopping 11 of 14 shots. This was his second All-Star appearance. He also became the first goaltender to face and stop penalty shot in the 57-year history of the NHL All-Star Game (the penalty shot was attempted by Matt Duchene of the Colorado Avalanche). On 17 February 2011, Lundqvist earned his 200th NHL win in a 4–3 shootout victory over the Los Angeles Kings at Madison Square Garden. On 19 March 2011, Lundqvist became the first NHL goaltender to win at least 30 games in his first six seasons in a 6–3 win over the Montreal Canadiens at Madison Square Garden.

On 24 January 2012, Lundqvist earned his 40th career shutout, defeating the Winnipeg Jets 3–0 at Madison Square Garden. After making 42 saves in a 3–0 shutout victory over the Boston Bruins on 14 February 2012, Rangers fans began using the term "Lundsanity" in association with Lundqvist, as around this time the term "Linsanity" was being used to describe basketball player Jeremy Lin's meteoric rise to fame with the National Basketball Association's New York Knicks, who, like the Rangers, also play at Madison Square Garden.

On 27 February 2012, Lundqvist extended his own record as he became the first NHL goaltender to win at least 30 games in his first seven seasons in a 2–0 shutout win over the New Jersey Devils in New York.

On 20 June 2012, Lundqvist won the Vezina Trophy at the 2012 NHL Awards in Las Vegas. On 24 November 2012, Lundqvist participated in "Operation Hat Trick," a charity hockey game held at Boardwalk Hall in Atlantic City to raise money for Hurricane Sandy victims.

On 3 March 2013, Lundqvist took the NHL all-time lead in shootout wins over Martin Brodeur, winning his 43rd against the Buffalo Sabres. On 3 April 2013, Lundqvist won his 268th game, surpassing Eddie Giacomin for the second most wins in Rangers history, behind only Mike Richter. On 13 and 14 May 2013, Lundqvist recorded back-to-back playoff shutouts against the Washington Capitals. However, Lundqvist and the Rangers would be eliminated by the eventual Eastern Conference champion Boston Bruins in five games.

Staying in New York, Stanley Cup Finals and Presidents' Trophy
On 4 December 2013, Lundqvist signed a seven-year, $59.5 million contract extension with the Rangers, making Lundqvist the highest-paid goaltender in the NHL with an average annual cap hit of $8.5 million.

On 18 March 2014, Lundqvist passed Mike Richter with his 302nd win to become the most winning goaltender in Rangers history after defeating the Ottawa Senators 8–4.

On 22 March 2014, Lundqvist passed Hall of Fame goaltender Eddie Giacomin with his 50th regular season shutout to become the Rangers' shutout leader after defeating the New Jersey Devils 2–0 at the Prudential Center.

With the 2–1 victory over the Pittsburgh Penguins in the Eastern Conference Semifinals on 13 May, Lundqvist earned an NHL-record five-straight Game 7 wins. On 29 May, he shut-out the Montreal Canadiens 1–0 in Game 6 to help take the Rangers to the 2014 Stanley Cup Finals against the Los Angeles Kings, and Lundqvist also surpassed Mike Richter on the most playoff wins list (42) in the process. However, the Rangers would ultimately be defeated by the Kings 4–1. In Game 5, Alec Martinez scored in double overtime off a Tyler Toffoli rebound to give the Kings their second Stanley Cup title in three years.

Lundqvist's performance in the 2014–15 season was also stellar. However, in a game on 31 January 2015, against the Carolina Hurricanes, Lundqvist took a shot to his neck from Brad Malone. He stayed in net for the game, which the Rangers won 4–2, and went in net for another game on February 2, a 6–3 win over the Florida Panthers, before it was discovered that a blood vessel in Lundqvist's neck was damaged and that Lundqvist would be out for five-to-seven weeks as a result. Despite the superior performance of backup goaltender Cam Talbot during Lundqvist's absence, Lundqvist would remain the Rangers' starter upon his return on 28 March, in a 4–2 loss to the Boston Bruins. Despite missing nearly two months, Lundqvist was able to earn 30 wins for the ninth time in his career, going 5–2–0 after returning from the injury. At the end of the 2014–15 regular season the Rangers won the Presidents' Trophy. Lundqvist started all 19 Rangers games in the 2015 playoffs and recorded a 2.11 GAA and .928 save percentage. Even though Lundqvist was stellar in net, the Rangers struggled to produce offensively, especially in the Eastern Conference Finals, which they lost in seven games to the Tampa Bay Lightning.

Final years in New York
On 16 January 2016, Lundqvist recorded his 20th victory of the season, making him the first NHL goaltender to start his career with 11 straight 20-win seasons. Lundqvist also joined Hockey Hall of Fame member Tony Esposito and retired goaltender Martin Brodeur as the only goaltenders with 11 consecutive 20-win seasons at any point in their career. Overall, Lundqvist became the 15th NHL netminder to have won at least 20 games in a season 11 times. On 1 November 2016, Lundqvist recorded his 60th shutout in a 5–0 win over the St. Louis Blues. On 31 December 2016, Lundqvist recorded his 390th career win in a game against the Colorado Avalanche. In doing so, he surpassed Hall of Fame goaltender Dominik Hašek to become the all-time wins leader among European-born goaltenders.

On 11 February 2017, Lundqvist recorded his 400th win in a game against the Colorado Avalanche, becoming the 12th player in NHL history to earn 400 wins. He is also the first European-born goaltender to reach the mark, the first in Rangers history to do so, and the quickest in NHL history to do so. On 16 January 2018, Lundqvist earned his 20th win of the 2017–18 season and became the only goaltender in NHL history to win at least 20 games in 13 consecutive seasons.

On 7 March 2019, Lundqvist became the third goaltender in NHL history to play at least 850 games with one franchise. On 3 October 2019, Lundqvist earned his 450th win in the 2019–20 season opener against the Winnipeg Jets, making him the sixth goaltender to reach the mark, and the second one to do so with one franchise. He made 43 saves in the game, tying a franchise record for most by a Rangers goaltender in a season opener, the highest amount since Gump Worsley in 1955. On 25 November, Lundqvist earned his 455th win and surpassed Curtis Joseph for fifth place in all-time wins in NHL history.

Following the 2019–20 season, it became apparent that Lundqvist would be the odd man out following the emergence of Rangers goaltenders Alexandar Georgiev and Igor Shesterkin. Lundqvist was bought out of his contract on 30 September 2020, making him a free agent for the first time in his career.

Washington Capitals and retirement (2020–2021)
On 9 October 2020, Lundqvist signed a one-year, $1.5 million contract with the Washington Capitals. However, on 17 December, Lundqvist announced that he would miss the 2020–21 season due to an irregular heartbeat brought upon by pericarditis, which required an open-heart surgery that was performed in January 2021. Lundqvist returned to practice in late February 2021. On 11 April, Lundqvist announced that he would not return to the Capitals lineup during the 2020–21 season.

On 20 August 2021, Lundqvist announced his retirement from professional ice hockey. That same day, the Rangers announced that they would retire number 30 in his honor during the 2021–22 season, which was retired on 28 January 2022.

International play

Lundqvist is the all-time leader among goaltenders, and 11th overall of all players, in games played for the Swedish national junior's ice hockey team.

At the 2001 World U20 Championship in Moscow, Lundqvist led Sweden to a fourth-place finish in the tournament. After an upset 3–2 win over the hosting nation Russia in the quarterfinals, Sweden lost 0–1 against the Czech Republic in the semifinals, and 1–2 in overtime against Canada in the bronze medal game.

Lundqvist debuted for the senior Swedish team on 10 November 2002 in the 2002 Karjala Tournament in Helsinki.

Lundqvist was selected to the 2003 World Championship but was third string goaltender behind Tommy Salo and Mikael Tellqvist. The following year, at the 2004 World Championship, Lundqvist was the starting goaltender and he was selected to the tournament all-star team.

Lundqvist and Jörgen Jönsson were the only two Elitserien players selected to play for Sweden at the 2004 World Cup of Hockey. Lacking experience on the smaller ice surface, Lundqvist was again third string behind Salo and Tellqvist.

In the 2004–05 Euro Hockey Tour, Lundqvist was named best goaltender in Karjala Tournament and Sweden Hockey Games by the directorate, as well as to the media all-star team in both tournaments. At the 2005 World Championship in Vienna and Innsbruck, Austria, Lundqvist played in all nine games during the tournament, where Sweden eventually lost the bronze medal game against Russia.

Lundqvist's most memorable international performance came at the 2006 Winter Olympics in Turin, where he led Sweden to the gold medal over their archrivals Finland. In six Olympic starts, Lundqvist went 5–1, allowing only 12 goals with a .907 save percentage. He holds the career record for most shutouts in best-on-best hockey, with four.

In the 2017 World Championship, Lundqvist joined the Swedish team in the group stage and stayed in net for all five remaining games, including the final against Canada. Lundqvist had an excellent tournament and recorded a 1.31 GAA, and a .946 save percentage. The final against Canada went into a shootout and Lundqvist stopped all four Canadian chances to lead his country to its tenth World Championship title, on a national team captained by his identical twin brother Joel Lundqvist.

Lundqvist joined Sweden again in the 2019 World Championship right after the NHL season ended. Sweden finished the tournament in fifth place after a 5–4 overtime loss to Finland in the quarterfinals, marking the only time Lundqvist lost to the Finnish team.

Inline hockey
Lundqvist led team Sweden with spectacular goaltending to their first ever medal in inline hockey when they won gold at the 2002 IIHF InLine Hockey World Championship.

Personal life

Family
Lundqvist married Therese Andersson in the summer of 2011, and the couple have two daughters.

Charity work
In 2009, Lundqvist became the Rangers spokesman for the Garden of Dreams Foundation, which works mostly with Madison Square Garden and its tenants to host charitable events and grant wishes to sick children, similar to the Make-A-Wish Foundation. In this role, Lundqvist hosts events and records public service messages. In order to benefit the charity, Lundqvist launched a clothing line, called the Crown Collection, on 19 January 2012. The items of the Crown Collection were available exclusively at retail outlets within the confines of Madison Square Garden.

In 2014, Lundqvist and his wife Therese founded the Henrik Lundqvist Foundation a non-profit organization with a focus on health and education for children and families. HLF is an international grantmaking organization, with community partners in New York City, Sweden and the Dominican Republic. The Henrik Lundqvist Foundation hosted its inaugural fundraising event on 14 September 2014, at Refinery Rooftop. The evening included a silent auction, a Q&A session hosted by NHL Network's Kevin Weekes & an acoustic performance by Henrik Lundqvist and bandmate John McEnroe. Lundqvist was named a finalist for the 2014–15 NHL Foundation Player Award for his exemplary work with the Henrik Lundqvist Foundation as well as the Garden of Dreams Foundation. On 29 June 2015, Lundqvist was selected as an athlete finalist for the first ever ESPN Humanitarian of the Year Awards for his commitment to "using the power of sports to transform lives and uplift communities."

Hobbies and other ventures

In 2004, Lundqvist was awarded "Best Dressed" in Sweden. In April 2006, he was named one of People'''s World's 100 Most Beautiful People. In December 2008, he was named one of Page Six magazine's Top 25 Best Dressed in 2008.

Lundqvist used to play guitar in a Swedish rock band called Box Play during his time in Frölunda and plays guitar in his spare time.

Lundqvist owns a restaurant called Tiny's located in Tribeca. He has worked on this project with former Rangers teammate Sean Avery, who owned his own restaurant in New York City called Warren 77, and some other business partners.

On 10 July 2013, he hosted the 1.5-hour talk show Sommar'' on Swedish public radio.

Broadcast career
Lundqvist will be part of MSG Network's Rangers coverage for the 2021–22 season. Lundqvist will be in the studio for around 20 games, joining host John Giannone and analyst Steve Valiquette. He made his debut on 15 October 2021, prior to the Rangers' home opener against the Dallas Stars. Lundqvist is also an in studio analyst for the NHL on TNT.

Career statistics

Regular season and playoffs

International

Records

Elitserien records
 Goals against average (1.45) and save percentage (.948) in 2002–03
 Goals against average (1.79) and save percentage (.936) in 2004–05

New York Rangers/NHL records
 Only goaltender in NHL history to record 30 wins in each of first seven seasons
 First NHL goaltender to start his career with 11 straight, 20-win seasons, and became overall the 15th NHL goaltender to have won at least 20 games in a season 11 times
 Most shutouts by a goaltender in Madison Square Garden
 New York Rangers club record, games played, single season: 73 (2009–10)
 The Rangers all-time leader in shutouts (regular season and playoffs combined): 74
 Most wins (459) by a New York Rangers goaltender
 Fastest goaltender to record 400 wins in NHL history
 Most shutouts (64) by a New York Rangers goaltender
 Most Playoffs wins (61) by a New York Rangers goaltender
 Consecutive Game 7 wins (6)
 Most combined games played (985)
 Most combined regular season and playoff saves
 Most wins by a European-born goaltender in NHL history
 Most saves in the shootout by a goaltender (career)
 First goaltender in NHL history with consecutive 50+ save wins (since shots were first tracked in the 1955–56 season). Announced during a broadcast on 3 March 2018, he had 100 saves on 106 shots in the last two games played

Olympics records
 Winter Olympics record for consecutive minutes without allowing a goal: 172 minutes and 34 seconds (2006 to 2010)

Awards

Elitserien awards

NHL/New York Rangers awards

Nominations

International

See also
 List of family relations in the NHL

References

External links

 
 Henrik Lundqvist biography at hockeygoalies.org

1982 births
Living people
Frölunda HC players
Ice hockey players at the 2006 Winter Olympics
Ice hockey players at the 2010 Winter Olympics
Ice hockey players at the 2014 Winter Olympics
Identical twins
Medalists at the 2006 Winter Olympics
Medalists at the 2014 Winter Olympics
National Hockey League All-Stars
New York Rangers draft picks
New York Rangers players
Olympic gold medalists for Sweden
Olympic ice hockey players of Sweden
Olympic medalists in ice hockey
Olympic silver medalists for Sweden
People from Åre Municipality
Sommar (radio program) hosts
Swedish expatriate ice hockey players in the United States
Swedish ice hockey goaltenders
Swedish philanthropists
Swedish twins
Twin sportspeople
Vezina Trophy winners
Sportspeople from Jämtland County